"Big Jumps" is the second single by Emilíana Torrini released from her third album Me and Armini. It was released as a digital download only on October 13, 2008. The song didn't chart.

Critical reception
The critical reception towards the song was warm; Popmatters reviewer Spencer Tricker called "Big Jumps" the "catchiest tune" on the album (alongside Jungle Drum), "every bit as good as the singles from Fisherman's Woman". Andrew Leahey from allmusic wrote that the song features "strings of endearing doop-de-doop vocals and a commercial pop chorus" and Matthew Allard from ARTISTdirect said it "up[s] the tempo in a sunny, radio-ready way".

Track listing
From 7digital
 "Big Jumps" — 3:02

References

Emilíana Torrini songs
2008 singles
Songs written by Emilíana Torrini
Songs written by Dan Carey (record producer)
2008 songs
Rough Trade Records singles